"In the Mood" is a big band-era song popularized by Glenn Miller. It may also refer to:

Film, theatre and TV
 In the Mood, a 1983 play by Keith Waterhouse
 In the Mood (TV series), a 1971–72 Canadian television series
 In the Mood (film), a 1987 film starring Patrick Dempsey
 In the Mood (2006 film), a short film funded by the UK Film Council Completion Fund
 "In the Mood", a series-one episode of the British sitcom Goodnight Sweetheart
 "In the Mood", a series-four episode of the British sitcom Goodnight Sweetheart

Music
 In the Mood (album), a 1966 jazz album by Chet Baker and the Mariachi Brass
 "In the Mood" (Ricki-Lee Coulter song)
 "In the Mood" (Tyrone Davis song), a 1979 song by Tyrone Davis
 "In the Mood" (Robert Plant song)
 "In the Mood" (Rush song)
 "In the Mood", a song by Alphaville from Forever Young
 "In the Mood", a song by To My Surprise from To My Surprise
 "In The Mood", a song by Hellyeah from their eponymous album